is a Japanese footballer currently playing as a defender for Azul Claro Numazu.

Career statistics

Club
.

Notes

References

External links

2001 births
Living people
Association football people from Kyoto Prefecture
Japanese footballers
Association football defenders
J3 League players
Japan Football League players
Kyoto Sanga FC players
Azul Claro Numazu players
Suzuka Point Getters players